The Dixie Athletic Conference was a short-lived IHSAA-sanctioned conference in Southern Indiana. The conference was formed in 1961 by smaller, far-flung schools. In 1965, left with only four schools, it merged with the Southern Monon Conference to form the Dixie-Monon Conference.

Membership

 Played concurrently in DCC and JCC throughout membership in Dixie.

References

Indiana high school athletic conferences
High school sports conferences and leagues in the United States
Indiana High School Athletic Association disestablished conferences